Enemy of the Bane is the sixth and final serial of the second series of the British science fiction television series The Sarah Jane Adventures. It first aired in two weekly parts on the CBBC channel on 1 and 8 December 2008. This story was originally intended to be a crossover with the modern Doctor Who series; Russell T Davies, an executive producer of Doctor Who and creator of The Sarah Jane Adventures reveals in his non-fiction book Doctor Who: The Writer's Tale that former companion Martha Jones was intended to appear in the two-parter, but had to be replaced with classic series character Brigadier Lethbridge-Stewart (Nicholas Courtney) "at the last minute" due to Freema Agyeman's role in the ITV series Law & Order: UK, making this the last episode to have Courtney as the Brigadier prior to his death in 2011.

Plot
Mrs Wormwood is now a fugitive from her people, the Bane kindred, after being blamed for the death of the Bane Mother and the failed invasion of Earth. She is searching for the body of Horath, an immortal cyborg that was defeated and had its consciousness separated and placed at opposite ends of the galaxy 3,000 years ago. Tricking Sarah Jane and her friends into finding the portal that leads to the body of Horath, Wormwood tells them that the Bane have the consciousness, when it is actually in the possession of the disgraced Sontaran commander Kaagh, now working for Wormwood as a mercenary following his defeat. 

Aided by Sarah Jane's old friend, Brigadier Lethbridge-Stewart, Sarah Jane and Rani sneak into the UNIT Black Archive, a secure storehouse of alien artefacts, to get the Tunguska scroll, which can find the Neolithic stone circle leading to the dimension where the body of Horath is kept. When the Bane find Wormwood in Sarah Jane's house, Kaagh arrives, and he and Wormwood kill them. Kaagh forces Sarah Jane to give up the scroll to Wormwood by threatening Sarah Jane's friends.

Wormwood and Kaagh take Luke to the stone circle, which is protected by a force field that can only be crossed by a human. Wormwood forces Luke to enter and place the scroll on the central stone, which opens the portal to the dimension where the body of Horath is located. Luke rejects his creator Wormwood's assertion that he will join her as co-ruler of the universe. Kaagh, ashamed of his submission to Mrs Wormwood, pushes her into the portal and is dragged in with her as it closes. Sarah Jane destroys the scroll to ensure that the portal remains permanently closed.

Continuity
Mrs Wormwood last appeared alongside the Bane in the series one episode "Invasion of the Bane". Commander Kaagh last appeared in the series two story The Last Sontaran. Brigadier Lethbridge-Stewart last appeared in the Doctor Who serial Battlefield, although he had a brief cameo in the charity special Dimensions in Time. This is the first time that Sarah Jane and the Brigadier have met on screen since The Five Doctors, almost exactly 25 years earlier (aside from the 1995 direct-to-video, Downtime).

Notes

References

External links

The official BBC The Sarah Jane Adventures website
Press Pack information regarding Enemy of the Bane at the BBC Press Office website

The Sarah Jane Adventures episodes
2008 British television episodes
UNIT stories
Doctor Who crossovers